Oxyurichthys auchenolepis, commonly known as the scaly-nape tentacle goby, is a species of goby found in the western central Pacific (China, Japan, Philippines, Thailand, Singapore, Indonesia, northern Australia).

References

Pezold, P.L. and H.K. Larson, 2015. A revision of the fish genus Oxyurichthys (Gobioidei: Gobiidae) with descriptions of four new species. Zootaxa 3988(1):1-95. 

auchenolepis
Fish of Southeast Asia
Fish of the Pacific Ocean
Fish of the Philippines
Fish of Bangladesh
Fish of Cambodia
Fish of China
Fish of India
Fish of Indonesia
Fish of Japan
Fish of Taiwan
Fish of Thailand
Fish of Vietnam
Taxa named by Pieter Bleeker
Fish described in 1876